USS Apache or USNS Apache has been the name of more than one United States Navy ship, and may refer to:

 , a tug in commission in 1898 and again in service from 1900 to 1925
 , a United States Coast Guard Cutter in commission in the U.S. Navy from 1917 to 1919
 , later USS SP-729, a patrol boat in commission from 1917 to 1919
 , ex-AT-67, a fleet tug in commission from 1942 to 1946 and from 1951 to 1974
 , a fleet tug in service with the Military Sealift Command since 1981

United States Navy ship names